Lead Upturn 2006: 4 (stylized as LEAD UPTURN 2006 [4]) is the third concert DVD by the Japanese hip-hop group Lead, released on year after their previous live tour Lead Live Tour Upturn 2005. It performed better on the Oricon charts than their last DVD, coming in at #24 and remaining on the charts for two weeks.

While the tour mainly coincided with their studio album 4, it also featured songs from their debut album Life On Da Beat (2003).

Information
Lead Upturn 2006: 4 is the third concert DVD released by the Japanese hip-hop group Lead, released on December 6, 2006 - one full year after their previous live DVD, Lead Live Tour Upturn 2005. The DVD charted well on the Oricon DVD charts, charting at #24 and remaining on the charts for two consecutive weeks.

While the tour was predominantly composed of music from their fourth studio album 4, it also carried music from their previous albums. Bonus features on the DVD included a behind-the-scenes making, including dance rehearsals and interviews

The performance placed on the DVD was of their August 28 performance at the Kanagawa Prefectural Civic Hall in the Naka Ward of Yokohama in the Kanagawa Prefecture.

During the tour, the group performed two songs that would remain tour exclusives, whereas they were never given an official release on a future single or album. These songs were "Time to Jam" (TIME TO JAM) and "356STEP".

Track listing

DVD
"Rough Style"
"Deep in my heart"
"Star Playa"
"Fly Away"
"Manatsu no Magic"
"Love Rain"
"Eien no Ichi-byou"
"Shake Up"
"Show me the way"
"356STEP"
"What cha gonna?"
"Higher Revolution"
"Time To Jam"
"Jewel of Queen"
"Only You Can Hurt Me"
"Believe in myself"
"I believe"
"Baby'cuz U!"
"Baby Runnin' Wild"
"Virgin Blue"
"Summer Madness"
"Party tune"
"One"Bonus Track
"Off-Shot"

Charts (Japan)

References

External links
Lead Official Site

2006 video albums
Live video albums
Lead (band) video albums